Abigail Gómez Hernández (born 31 January 1991) is a Mexican javelin thrower who competes in international elite track and field events. She participated at the 2011 Pan American Games and she is also a triple Mexican champion in the javelin throw.

References

1991 births
Living people
People from Veracruz (city)
Mexican female javelin throwers
Athletes (track and field) at the 2011 Pan American Games
Sportspeople from Veracruz
21st-century Mexican women
Competitors at the 2014 Central American and Caribbean Games
Central American and Caribbean Games silver medalists for Mexico
Central American and Caribbean Games medalists in athletics